Phi Gruis, Latinised from φ Gruis, is a solitary, yellow-white hued star in the southern constellation of Grus, near the eastern constellation border with Phoenix. It is faintly visible to the naked eye with an apparent visual magnitude of +5.49. The star is drifting further away with a radial velocity of +15 km/s.

This object is an F-type main-sequence star with a stellar classification of F4 V, where the luminosity class of 'V' indicates it is currently generating energy through hydrogen fusion at its core. It is 2.12 billion years old and is spinning with a projected rotational velocity of 20 km/s. The star has 1.45 times the mass of the Sun and 1.87 times the Sun's radius. It is radiating 5.8 times as much luminosity as the Sun from its photosphere at an effective temperature of 6,606 km/s.

References

F-type main-sequence stars
Grus (constellation)
Gruis, Phi
CD-41 15211
4340
219693
115054
8859